Abdelmadjid Benatia (born December 12, 1984, in Oran, Algeria) is a former Algerian international football player. He played as a midfielder, essentially for MC Oran in the Algerian Championship. He was part of the Algerian national U21 football team at the 2005 Islamic Solidarity Games.

External links
 

1984 births
Algerian footballers
Living people
Algeria international footballers
MC Oran players
ASM Oran players
USM Bel Abbès players
CS Constantine players
WA Tlemcen players
SA Mohammadia players
Algerian Ligue Professionnelle 1 players
Algeria under-23 international footballers
Footballers from Oran
Association football midfielders
21st-century Algerian people